"Just the Girl" is a song by American rock band the Click Five. It was released on June 13, 2005, as the first single from their debut studio album, Greetings from Imrie House (2005). The band formed in Boston and were managed by talent scout Wayne Sharp, who assisted in signing the band to Lava Records. "Just the Girl" was composed by songwriter Adam Schlesinger, best-known for his work with Fountains of Wayne, as well as his career in film and television.

The single was the band's biggest mainstream hit, achieving heavy airplay on top 40 radio in the United States. It reached number 11 on the U.S. Billboard Hot 100. For Schlesinger, it was his highest-charting effort. The song received positive reviews from critics.

Background
The pop-rock quintet the Click Five emerged from Boston in the early 2000s. Their manager was Wayne Sharp, a talent scout with a background in jazz. Sharp had previously attempted to form a radio-ready pop outfit two decades prior with Candy, and styled the Click Five with identical suits and mod haircuts. The group signed to major label Lava Records in 2004, touring in support of singer Ashlee Simpson. Afterward, the band began recording their debut LP, Greetings from Imrie House, with producer Mike Denneen. The engineer had previously worked with power-pop band Fountains of Wayne, producing their 2003 hit album Welcome Interstate Managers.

"Just the Girl" was supplied to the group by that band's bassist, songwriter Adam Schlesinger, also-known for writing the title song to the film That Thing You Do!, which coincidentally also centered on a manufactured band "designed to generate Beatlemania-type hysteria." The band were fans of Fountains of Wayne, commenting in an interview that they were essentially "handed" the "unreleased Fountains of Wayne song."

Chart performance
"Just the Girl" debuted at number 83 on the Billboard Hot 100 the week of July 30, 2005. Two weeks later, it moved sixteen spots from number 68 to number 52 the week of August 13, 2005. It reached the top 40 on the week of August 20, 2005, moving thirty-one spots to number 21. It peaked at number 11 the week of September 3, 2005 and stayed there for two weeks, remaining on the chart for twenty weeks.

For Schlesinger, it was the highest-charting single of his career.

Reception
Initial reviews of the song were positive. Billboard contributor Chuck Taylor considered it reminiscent of boy-band LFO, dubbing it "just tough enough to be cool, but power poppy enough to have the braces crowd bellowing in unison." Jessica Grose of Spin viewed the band's debut, Greetings from Imrie House, as banal and manufactured, but singled out "Just the Girl" as the "only palatable song [...] and that's because Click Five didn't write it."

After Schlesinger's passing, Tom Breihan at Stereogum described the song as a "processed, professional, infectious teen-longing jam that evoked the Cars and Ashlee Simpson at the same time." Evan Sawdey from PopMatters similarly viewed the track as full of hooks but cringe-inducing all the same. Songwriter Sam Hollander praised the tune as among Schlesinger's best, "brilliantly crafted" and evoking the great "power pop songbook". In a New Yorker piece examining Schlesinger's "incandescent" skill at songwriting, critic Jody Rosen included it among his best: "cleverness is on display in all [of Schlesinger's collaborations], but the songs are never mere exercises in style. They’re always full of feeling and ideas. They're always a little weird."

Music video
Directed by Paul Hunter & Vem Miller (aka Vem of Vem & Troy), the video features the band arriving on the roof of the fictional Paul Stanley Preparatory High School ("Home of the Fighting Starchildren"), named after Kiss frontman Paul Stanley, via helicopter, with the students passing a note saying that the band is performing on said roof and leaving their classrooms to watch them perform. Then-couple Christopher Knight and Adrianne Curry appear in the video as a teacher named Mr. Denneen, a nod to the band's producer Mike Denneen, and one of his students who has braided pigtails, respectively.

Charts and certifications

Weekly charts

Year-end charts

Certifications

References

External links
The Click Five official website

2005 singles
2005 songs
The Click Five songs
Lava Records singles
Music videos directed by Paul Hunter (director)
Songs written by Adam Schlesinger